Are You Nervous? is the only studio album by Rock Kills Kid, released on 25 April 2006 in the United States.  "Paralyzed" was released as a single and reached number 12 on the US Modern Rock Tracks chart.

Track listing
"Paralyzed" – 3:04
"Hideaway" – 4:01
"Midnight" – 3:34
"Are You Nervous?" – 3:15
"Back to Life" – 4:32
"Life's a Bitch" – 3:57
"Run Like Hell" - 3:59
"Don't Want to Stay" – 3:18
"Hope Song" – 3:59
"Raise Your Hands" – 3:54
"I Need You" - 4:10 (bonus track)

References

2006 debut albums
Rock Kills Kid albums
Albums produced by Mark Trombino